Christian Savio Machado, commonly known as Christian is a Brazilian footballer who plays as a midfielder for Figueirense.

Career
Christian came through the youth system at América Mineiro, making his debut in 2016 Campeonato Brasileiro Série A on 20 August 2016 as a substitute against Chapecoense.

References

External links
 

Living people
1995 births
Brazilian footballers
Association football midfielders
América Futebol Clube (MG) players
Campeonato Brasileiro Série A players
Campeonato Brasileiro Série B players